Mehmet Günal (born 7 October 1964) is a Turkish economist and politician, who serves as the Deputy Leader of the Nationalist Movement Party (MHP) responsible for Turkish world and International relations since 11 May 2016. He has served as a Member of Parliament for Antalya since 22 July 2007.

Günal is a graduate of Ankara University. Before entering politics, he worked as an expert at the Central Bank of the Republic of Turkey. Married and able to speak semi-fluent English, he wrote five economy books.

References 

1964 births
Living people
Ankara University alumni
Nationalist Movement Party politicians
Turkish economists